Andrew Donally (1924-1991) was a British film producer. He worked for a number of years with Irving Allen.

Filmography
A Matter of Life and Death (1946) - support team
High Treason (1951) - assistant
Curtain Up (1952) -assistant
Hammerhead (1968) - associate producer
The Desperados (1969) - associate producer
Run Wild, Run Free (1969) - executive producer
Cromwell (1970) - associate producer
Nicholas and Alexandra (1971) - associate producer
Psychomania (1973) - producer
The Golden Voyage of Sinbad (1973) - production executive
Summer Wishes, Winter Dreams (1973) - unit manager
The Internecine Project (1974) - producer
Conduct Unbecoming (1975) - producer
Sinbad and the Eye of the Tiger (1977) - associate producer
Dominique (1979)  - producer
The Martian Chronicles (1980) (miniseries) - producer
Priest of Love (1981) - producer
Gossip (1982) - producer
The Zany Adventures of Robin Hood (1984) (TV Movie) - producer

External links

British film producers
1924 births
1991 deaths
20th-century British businesspeople
Place of birth missing
Place of death missing